Sylvie Swinkels (born 31 July 2000) is a Dutch professional racing cyclist, who currently rides for UCI Women's Continental Team . She is the younger sister of cyclist Karlijn Swinkels.

References

External links
 

2000 births
Living people
Dutch female cyclists
Place of birth missing (living people)
People from Veghel
Cyclists from North Brabant
21st-century Dutch women